Street of Dreams may refer to:
 Street of Dreams (film), a 1988 television film
 Street of Dreams (musical), a musical theatre production based on Coronation Street
 Street of Dreams (Grant Green album) (1964)
 Street of Dreams (Sofia Talvik album) (2007)
 "Street of Dreams" (1932 song), a song by Victor Young
 "Street of Dreams" (Rainbow song) (1983)
 "Street of Dreams" (Guns N' Roses song) (2008)
 "Street of Dreams" (The Damned song), a song by The Damned on their 1985 album Phantasmagoria
 Street of Dreams, a 1979 album by Frank Carillo
 Street of Dreams (event), an annual new house showcase in the Portland, Oregon area